Shackelford may refer to

Places
Shackelford, California, a neighborhood of the city of Modesto
Shackelford County, Texas, named in honor of Jack Shackelford

Surname
Brian Shackelford (born 1976), Baseball pitcher
Douglas A. Shackelford, American academic, dean of the  Kenan–Flagler Business School at the University of North Carolina at Chapel Hill
Edmund Meredith Shackelford (1786–1857), American brigadier general
Francis Shackelford ( – 1973), US General Counsel of the Army and Assistant Secretary of the Army (General Management)
Jack Shackelford (1790–1857), American doctor and soldier who fought in the Texas Revolution, survivor of the Goliad Massacre
Jaden Shackelford (born 2001), American basketball player
James B. Shackelford (1886–1969), American cinematographer
James M. Shackelford (1827–1907), lawyer, judge and Union Army general during the American Civil War, first federal judge assigned to Indian Territory (now Oklahoma)
John Williams Shackelford (1844–1883), U.S. Congressman from North Carolina
John Shackelford (baseball), (born 1894), Negro league baseball player
Kevin Shackelford (born 1989), American baseball player
Lottie Shackelford, African-American politician, first woman mayor of Little Rock, Arkansas
Lynn Shackelford (born 1947), American basketball player
Sonny Shackelford (born 1985), American football player
Ted Shackelford (born 1946), American actor
Thomas Shackelford (died 1877), Chief Justice of the Supreme Court of Mississippi 
Todd K. Shackelford (born 1971), American psychologist

Fictional
Shackelford, character in Clifford's Really Big Movie
J.D. Shackelford, recurring character in Designing Women
Ted Shackelford, name of the Man in the Yellow Hat in the 2006 film Curious George

Given name
Shackelford Miller, Jr. (1892–1965), United States federal judge

See also
Shackleford (disambiguation)
Shacklefords (disambiguation)